The 2017–18 NBB Cup was the 50th edition of the Netherlands' national basketball cup tournament. Donar was the defending champion. Donar successfully defended its title, after beating runners-up ZZ Leiden in the Final. The Final was played on 25 March 2018 in MartiniPlaza in Groningen.

Format
In the first, second and third round teams from the Dutch second, third and fourth division participate. From the fourth round, teams from the Dutch Basketball League (DBL) enter the competition. Quarter- and semi-finals are played in a two-legged format. When a team form a tier lower than the DBL played a DBL team, one win is sufficient for the latter to advance to the next round.

Round and draw dates

Bracket

Fourth round

Quarter-finals

First leg

Second leg

Semi-finals

First leg

Second leg

Final

See also
2017–18 Dutch Basketball League

Notes

References

NBB Cup
NBB Cup